Agnelo Rufino Gracias (born 30 July 1939, in Mombasa) is the auxiliary bishop of the Roman Catholic Archdiocese of Bombay. On 8 October 2018, Gracias took office as apostolic administrator sede plena et ad nutum Sanctae Sedis of the diocese of jalandhar

References

External links
 http://www.catholic-hierarchy.org/bishop/bgraci.html

1939 births
20th-century Roman Catholic bishops in India
21st-century Roman Catholic bishops in India
Living people
People from Mombasa